Algérie Poste ("Algerian Post") is the state-owned company responsible for postal service in Algeria. It is headquartered in Bab Ezzouar, Algiers.

See also
Communications in Algeria

References

External links
Official website (Arabic, French)

Communications in Algeria
Government-owned companies of Algeria
Algeria
Algerian brands